Qumak S.A. is a Polish IT and technology company which designs and implements ICT solutions for private clients and the public sector. Qumak also collaborates with fifty technology companies which solutions it integrates and uses in order to create its own products adapted to the Polish market expectations.   
Since 3 August 2006 the company has been quoted on the Warsaw Stock Exchange.

The Qumak company has been cooperating with universities and research centers for years. She has implemented projects for institutions such as AGH University of Science and Technology in Kraków, the Jan Kochanowski University in Kielce, the Warsaw University of Technology and the University of Warsaw.

History 

The beginnings of the company dates back to second half of the 80s. In 1985 a company which manufactured and repaired electronic devices was created. 
In December 1997 the company was registered as Sekom S. A.

PHP Quamak Sp. z o.o was established in 1988. At first it sold computers and offered maintenance service. In July 1990 it opened a first computer and gadgets shop in the centre of Kraków. For further development, the company needed financial assets. Polish-American Enterprise Fund (PAEF), first venture capital fund, offered its support. As a result of arrangement made between the fund and the company, a joint venture company Qumak International Sp. z o.o. was set up in 1990/9.

In 1998 Sekom S.A. in agreement with Qumak International Sp. z o.o. created Sekom Group. It consisted also of two smaller companies: Blue-Bridge Sp. z o.o. and Gandalf Polska Sp z o.o.Thanks to the cooperation of entities specialized in various IT industries (security systems, video conferences systems) the group became an IT integrator with wide offer of services.

In 2002 the companies belonging to Sekom Group merged into one entity, Qumak-Sekom S.A. The new company became one of the most powerful Polish IT companies. The headquarters was located in Warsaw, in addition the company the held also a big branch in Cracow and offices in Bielsko Biała, Gdańsk, Radom and Poznań. The company's structure was based on three areas: integration, IT and building automation.

On 3 August 2006 Qumak-Sekom S.A. was quoted on Warsaw Stock Exchange.

In September 2012 the company adopted a new strategy for years 2013–2016. Its offer was adjusted in order to eliminate the least viable and least prospective lines of business. In January 2013 the company registered a new, shortened name and since then it has been operating as Qumak S.A. Currently, it has headquarters in Warsaw and branches in two cities, in Cracow and a smaller one in Gdańsk.

In 2013 the company created Research and Development Department, strengthening its cooperation with research and scientific sectors.

In 2015, the Qumak company celebrated the 30th anniversary of its foundation. 

October 25, 2018 The Management Board makes a decision on the preparation of a bankruptcy petition for Qumak S.A.

References 

Companies based in Warsaw
Business services companies established in 1985
Companies listed on the Warsaw Stock Exchange
Polish brands
Information technology companies of Poland
Polish companies established in 1985